GreenCity Arena is a proposed multi-purpose entertainment and sports arena located near Richmond, Virginia.

The GreenCity Arena is the tentative name of a planned 17,000-seat indoor arena being built near Richmond, on the site of the former Best Products headquarters location.

History
The $250 million arena will be constructed at the intersection of East Parham Road and Interstate 95. The arena construction is targeted for completion in 2026.

See also
 Richmond Coliseum
 Hampton Roads Rhinos
 Virginia Beach Arena

References

External links 
 GreenCity

Unbuilt indoor arenas in the United States
Indoor arenas in Virginia
Buildings and structures in Henrico County, Virginia
Sports venues in Richmond, Virginia